Ungogo is a Local Government Area in Kano State, Nigeria. Its Secretariat  are in the town of Ungogo to the north of the city of Kano.

It has an area of 204 km and a population of 369,657 at the 2006 census.

The postal code of the area is 700.

References

Local Government Areas in Kano State